R726 road may refer to:
 R726 road (Ireland)
 R726 (South Africa)